Joseph Hillier (born 24 April 1974 in Cornwall) is a British sculptor. His best known works include the Messenger, a public sculpture in Plymouth, Devon.

Early life and education
Hillier was born in Cornwall in 1974. He studied at Falmouth College of Art and Newcastle University. Tulane University awarded Hillier a scholarship in 2001 leading to completion of a Master of Fine Arts in New Orleans.

Career
Joseph Hillier had his first solo exhibition in 2005. His best known work is Messenger, which was commissioned in 2017 and erected in Plymouth, Devon in March 2019. 

Hillier is a Fellow of the Royal Society of Sculptors.

See also

 Lost-wax casting

References

External links

 Profile on The Sculpture Park
 Why the artist behind the UK's biggest bronze sculpture chose a woman as the subject

21st-century sculptors
English sculptors
English male sculptors
21st-century British sculptors
21st-century male artists
Alumni of Falmouth University
Alumni of Newcastle University
English contemporary artists
1974 births
Living people